A green hand (also "greenhand" or "greenie") is a term for an inexperienced crew member of a 19th-century whaler on his first voyage, and who would typically have the smallest "lay", or share, in the profits.

See also 
 Whaling
 History of Whaling

References

Whaling
Maritime history